Shib Ab District is a former district (bakhsh) of Zabol County, Sistan and Baluchestan Province, Iran. At the 2006 census, its population was 43,374, in 9,809 families.  The district had one city: Mohammadabad. It was separated out of Zabol County to form Hamun County.

References 

Zabol County
Districts of Sistan and Baluchestan Province